Alejandro Edmundo Trejo Zapata (born 8 August 1959) is a Chilean theater, television, and voice actor. He is best known for 2001's A Cab for Three, for which he received Best Actor awards at the Cinemanila and Gramado film festivals.

Biography 
Alejandro Trejo, a well-known Chilean actor, came to show business almost by chance, because the theater was his second choice. In 1979 he entered the Moneda Theater School directed by Pury Durante. In 1986 he founded, along with Juan Edmundo González, the street theater company El Clavo. As an actor he has participated in numerous plays, among which are Lautaro, by Isidora Aguirre, Historia de un galpón abandonado by Ramón Griffero, Tríptico, and El Señor Presidente, these last two with El Clavo. Later with the company La Batuta he participated in Chronicle of a Death Foretold, where he met Julio Milostich, and in Galileo Galilei. He starred in Macbeth under the direction of Englishman Ian Wooldrich, sharing the stage with actor Rodrigo González Rubio. He has made national and international tours. As a director he has distinguished himself with La comarca del jazmín by Óscar Castro, The Martian Chronicles by Ray Bradbury, El libro de Rebeca by Benjamin Galemiri, Loco afán by Pedro Lemebel, and El desvarío by Jorge Díaz, among others. In films, his performances stand out in A Cab for Three, The Sentimental Teaser, Machuca, and Los Debutantes. Trejo is also a voice actor who has been in that business for more than 20 years, lending his voice to various commercials, series, and television documentaries.

He has served as a juror for the Caleuche Awards, and hosted their first ceremony in 2016.

Awards 
 2002 Cinemanila International Film Festival Best Actor award for A Cab for Three
 2002 Gramado Film Festival Best Actor award for A Cab for Three
 2012 Altazor Award for Best Actor for Los archivos del cardenal

Filmography

Films 
 Historia de lagartos (1989)
 El cobrador (1994)
 The Sentimental Teaser (1999)
  (2000) – Pato
 A Cab for Three (2001) – Ulises Morales
  (2001) – Luis Bahamondes
 Tres noches de un sábado (2002)
 Los Debutantes (2003) – Don Pascual
  (2003) – Eduardo
 El juego de Arcibel (2003)
  (2004)
  (2004) – Ernesto
 Machuca (2004) - Willy
 Fuga (2006)
 La Recta Provincia (2007) – Celoso
  (2007)
  (2008)
  (2009)
  (2009) – Edwin
 Schop Sui (2010)
 Drama (2010)
 My Last Round (2010)
 El Tío (2013)
 Distancia (2015)
 Talión (2015)
 Argentino QL (2016)
 Trauma (2017)
 Sapo (2018)
 La Salamandra (2018)
 Swing (2018)
 Noche (2018)
 Vidas recicladas (2018)
 Perkin (2018)
 Mi amigo Alexis (2019)
 Piola (2020)
 Mientes (2020)

Telenovelas

TV series and specials

Voice acting 
 The Pink Panther Show – The Pink Panther
 Garfield and Friends – Bo
 VeggieTales - Larry the Cucumber (original dub)
 You're Under Arrest – Ken Nakajima
 Stargate SG-1 – Thor (2nd voice)
 Transformers: Animated – Henry Masterson/Headmaster
 Marmalade Boy – Jin Koishikawa
 Kinnikuman – Fight Reporter
 Sonic X – Mr. Tanaka
 Super Robot Monkey Team Hyperforce Go! – Mandarin
 Will and Dewitt – Additional voices
 Fritz Kunz – Comisario Rex
 Red – Marvin Boggs
 Ministry of Housing ad campaign – Armando Casas

Voice-over 
 La Roja Íntima – narrated the qualification of the Chilean national soccer team to the 2010 World Cup in South Africa, broadcast on 14 October 2009 on Canal 13

References

External links 
 

1954 births
20th-century Chilean male actors
21st-century Chilean male actors
Chilean male stage actors
Chilean male telenovela actors
Living people
Male actors from Santiago
Male voice actors